Solidago arguta, commonly called Atlantic goldenrod, cut-leaf goldenrod, and sharp-leaved goldenrod, is a species of flowering plant native to eastern and central North America. It grows along the Gulf and Atlantic states of the United States from Texas to Maine, inland as far as Ontario, Illinois, and Kansas. It is primarily found in areas of woodland openings, such as outcrops or clearings.

Description
Solidago arguta is a tall fall-flowering perennial. Flowers are small, yellow, and in heads. It can be distinguished from similar goldenrods by its broad basal leaves that are lightly pubescent to hairless, which decrease in size towards the apex of the stem.

Taxonomy
Four varieties are recognized by most authors. They are:
Solidago arguta var. arguta - With hairless achenes; native to the Appalachian Mountains and the Northeast
Solidago arguta var. boottii (Hook.) E.J.Palmer & Steyerm. - With pubescent achenes and leaves; native to the Ozark Mountains and the Gulf Coastal Plain
Solidago arguta var. caroliniana (Gray) G.H.Morton - With pubescent achenes and hairless leaves; native across the Southeastern United States
Solidago arguta var. harrisii Cronquist - With thick-textured, truncate basal leaves; native to the Central Appalachians

Due to its morphological distinctiveness and narrow geographic range, some modern taxonomists treat variety harrisii as a full species (named Solidago harrisii).

References

arguta
Flora of North America
Plants described in 1789